The Jalalabad prison attack was a terrorist attack by the Islamic State – Khorasan Province targeting Jalalabad Prison in Jalalabad, Afghanistan, which occurred on 2 August 2020.

Attack
On the evening of 2 August, 2020, a car bomb driven by ISKP suicide bomber Kalukettiya Purayil Ijas drove into the front gate of the prison and detonated. Following its detonation, 16 ISKP fighters stormed into the prison and began to free and release prisoners. The prison held 1,793 inmates consisting of captured Taliban and ISKP fighters. The attack on the prison lead to a 20-hour gunbattle that left 29 dead including five inmates that were killed by ISKP and 50 injured, 10 ISKP fighters were also killed in the gunbattles. During the attack, ISKP managed to free 1,025 prisoners of whom 270 remain were never recaptured.

See also
2013 attack on Indian consulate in Jalalabad
2015 Jalalabad suicide bombing
2019 Jalalabad suicide bombing
International military intervention against ISIL
July 2018 Jalalabad suicide bombing
List of prisons in Afghanistan
List of terrorist incidents linked to ISIL
List of wars and battles involving ISIL
Sarposa prison attack of 2008
Save the Children Jalalabad attack
September 2018 Jalalabad suicide bombing

References

2020 mass shootings in Asia
2020 murders in Afghanistan
Prison attack
21st-century mass murder in Afghanistan
Attacks on buildings and structures in 2020
August 2020 crimes in Asia
Building bombings in Afghanistan
Prison attack
Prison attack
ISIL terrorist incidents in Afghanistan
Islamic terrorist incidents in 2020
Mass murder in 2020
Mass shootings in Afghanistan
Prison raids
Suicide bombings in 2020
Suicide car and truck bombings in Afghanistan
Terrorist incidents in Afghanistan in 2020
Attacks in Afghanistan in 2020